The 1956 Ballon d'Or was the inaugural Ballon d'Or award given to the best football player in Europe as judged by a panel of sports journalists from UEFA member countries. Stanley Matthews received the award on 18 December 1956.

Rankings

Notes

References

External links
 France Football Official Ballon d'Or page

1956
1955–56 in European football